Daniel James Pepicelli (born May 18, 1967) is an American baseball coach and former outfielder, who is the current head baseball coach of the Cornell Big Red. He played college baseball at Mohawk Valley Community College, Cortland and Oneonta from 1986 to 1990. He served as the head coach of the Hartwick Hawks (1999–2000) and St. John Fisher Cardinals (2001–2009).

Coaching career
Pepicelli lead St. John Fisher College for 9 years, compiling a 200–136–1 record.

On October 5, 2009, Pepicelli left St. John Fisher so join the coaching staff of the Clemson Tigers baseball team.

On August 6, 2015, Pepicelli was named the head coach of the Cornell Big Red baseball program.

Head coaching record

See also
 List of current NCAA Division I baseball coaches

References

External links
Cornell Big Red bio

Living people
1967 births
Mohawk Valley Hawks baseball players
Mohawk Valley Hawks baseball coaches
Cortland Red Dragons baseball players
Oneonta State Red Dragons baseball players
Hartwick Hawks baseball coaches
St. John Fisher Cardinals baseball coaches
Clemson Tigers baseball coaches
Cornell Big Red baseball coaches
Sportspeople from Schenectady, New York
Baseball coaches from New York (state)
Sportspeople from Syracuse, New York